A Dandy loom was a hand loom, that automatically ratchetted the take-up beam. Each time the weaver moved the sley to beat-up the weft, a rachet and pawl mechanism advanced the cloth roller. In 1802 William Ratcliffe of Stockport patented a Dandy loom with a cast-iron frame. It was this type of Dandy loom that was used in the small dandy loom shops.

Economics
In the mid 1830s, there were about twice as many weavers operating a variety of different handlooms as there were power-looms. The dandy loom increased the productivity of a hand-loom weaver by 50%. The dandy-loom weaver would work in a small workshop and would rent the loom for 10½d a week and in 1825 could expect to earn 5s a week.

Timmins has tried to assess the relative importance of the hand-powered branch of the industry on the one hand and of the water- or steam-powered branches on the other. It is difficult: the output of power looms was certainly greater than that of the handlooms, but the handloom weavers produced higher quality cloths with greater profit margins. The weaving trade was only partially mechanised before about 1830, and that even so late as 1850, handloom weavers made up a sizeable minority of the total workforce as late as 1850.

References

Bibliography

Weaving equipment